The 1970 Kansas City Chiefs season was the franchise's debut season in the National Football League, the 8th as the Kansas City Chiefs, and the 11th overall. It began with the Chiefs attempting to defend their Super Bowl IV championship title but ended with a 7–5–2 record and missed the playoffs for the first time since 1967.

Following their championship success, the Chiefs traded running back Mike Garrett, who was the club's all-time leading rusher at the time, to San Diego after a week 3 loss in Denver, and replaced him in the lineup with Ed Podolak. Despite a 44–24 win against soon to be Super Bowl V Champion Baltimore on September 28 in just the second-ever telecast of ABC's Monday Night Football, the Chiefs owned a 3–3–1 record at the season's midpoint. One of the season's pivotal junctures came in a 17–17 tie against Oakland on November 1. The Chiefs were ahead 17–14 when Len Dawson apparently sealed the win, running for a first down which would have allowed Kansas City to run out the clock. While on the ground, Dawson was speared by Raiders defensive end Ben Davidson in an infamous incident that cost the Chiefs a victory and further inflamed the already heated Chiefs–Raiders rivalry. Wide receiver Otis Taylor retaliated and a bench-clearing brawl ensued. Offsetting penalties were called, nullifying Dawson's first down. The Chiefs were forced to punt and Raiders kicker George Blanda eventually booted a game-tying field goal with eight seconds remaining. Following the tie with Oakland the Chiefs' defense would permit only 43 points over the next 5 weeks, which included 4 wins and 6–6 tie with the St. Louis Cardinals at Municipal Stadium. The Cardinals had come into that game with a streak of three straight shutout wins. The Chiefs' D held St. Louis to a late FG as the game ended 6–6. After a 16–0 shutout of Denver the Chiefs had played to a 6–1–2 record over the past nine weeks to stand 7–3–2 with two weeks to play and very much looked like a team with a chance to defend its championship. Then came the big one at Oakland, the game that would decide who reigned supreme in pro football's toughest division. The game on December 12 was a Saturday stand-alone NBC national telecast. The Chiefs led early 3–0, and the game was tied 6–6 at the half. But the Raiders, behind the angry running of Marv Hubbard, dominated the 2nd half in a 20–6 AFC West title clinching win for Oakland. The Chiefs still had a slim hope for the AFC Wild Card spot. They however needed a win by a poor Buffalo team in Miami and then a Chiefs' win in San Diego to make the playoffs. Miami jumped to a 28–0 first quarter lead and rolled to a 45–7 win. The Chiefs warming up to play the Chargers saw the Miami blowout and knew their reign as Champions was over. Eliminated, the Chiefs played an uninspired sleep walk game, losing 31–13. In the end it was that tie in November with Oakland that ultimately cost the Chiefs the opportunity to win the AFC West division title as Kansas City finished the year with a 7–5–2 record, while the Raiders went 8–4–2. The rules were changed several years later to assess such penalties as the Davidson-Taylor incident as dead-ball fouls after the play counted.

Offseason

NFL Draft

Roster

Preseason

Regular season

Schedule

Game summaries

Week 2

Week 7 vs Raiders

Standings

References 

Kansas City Chiefs
Kansas City Chiefs seasons
Kansas